"Sick Love Song" is a song by the American heavy metal band Mötley Crüe, released on their 2005 compilation album, Red, White & Crüe. Written by bassist Nikki Sixx and collaborator James Michael, "Sick Love Song" was one of the few new tracks the band recorded specifically for the album and the song charted at number 22 on the Mainstream Rock chart.

Track listing
"Sick Love Song"
"Live Wire" (Leathür Records Version)
"Take Me To the Top" (Leathür Records Version)
"Sick Love Song" [Video]

Personnel
 Vince Neil - vocals
 Mick Mars - guitar
 Nikki Sixx - bass
 Tommy Lee - drums

Charts

References

External links

2005 singles
Mötley Crüe songs
Songs written by James Michael
2004 songs
Song recordings produced by Bob Rock
Songs written by Nikki Sixx
Alternative metal songs